Belthara Road railway station is a small railway station in Ballia district, Uttar Pradesh. Its code is BLTR. It serves Belthara Road city. The station consists of two platforms. The platforms are not well sheltered. It lacks many facilities including water and sanitation.

Major trains 
Some of the important trains that run from Belthara Road are:

 Chauri Chaura Express
 Krishak Express
 Gorakhpur–CSMT Kolhapur Express 
 Lichchavi Express
 Purvanchal Express (via Mau)
 Godaan Express
 Manduadih–Gorakhpur InterCity Express
 Durg–Nautanwa Express (via Varanasi)
 Durg–Nautanwa Express (via Sultanpur)
 Chhapra–Mumbai LTT Godan Express 
 Kashi Express

References

Railway stations in Ballia district
Varanasi railway division